Antennardia is a genus of midges in the family Cecidomyiidae. The four described species are found in the Holarctic realm. The genus was first described by Boris Mamaev in 1993, but was subsequently treated as a subgenus of Monardia until being reinstated at the genus level.

Species
Antennardia antennata (Winnertz, 1870)
Antennardia gallicola Mamaev, 1993
Antennardia saxonica (Jaschhof, 2003)
Antennardia suorkensis Jaschhof & Jaschhof, 2020

References

Cecidomyiidae genera

Insects described in 1993
Taxa named by Boris Mamaev